The 2003–04 CERS Cup was the 24th season of the CERS Cup, Europe's second club roller hockey competition organized by CERH. 19 teams from five national associations qualified for the competition as a result of their respective national league placing in the previous season. Following a preliminary phase and four knockout rounds, Reus Deportiu won its second consecutive title.

Preliminary phase 

|}

Knockout stage

See also
2003–04 CERH European League

References

External links
 CERH website
 RinkHockey.net

World Skate Europe Cup
CERS Cup
CERS Cup